Fimbristylis lanceolata is a sedge of the family Cyperaceae that is native to Australia.

It blooms between May and June and produces brown flowers.

In Western Australia it is found in the Kimberley region where it grows in alluvial soils.

References

Plants described in 1908
Flora of Western Australia
lanceolata
Taxa named by Charles Baron Clarke